Harald Katemann (born 7 July 1972) is a German former professional footballer who played as a midfielder. During his playing career, he was known for his long throw-ins.

Personal life
Following his retirement from playing, Katemann worked as an electrician and coached lower league teams.

References

External links
 

1972 births
Living people
German footballers
Association football midfielders
Bundesliga players
2. Bundesliga players
Austrian Football Bundesliga players
1. FC Bocholt players
Fortuna Düsseldorf players
SC Austria Lustenau players
German expatriate footballers
German expatriate sportspeople in Austria
Expatriate footballers in Austria